Bruno Foliados Suárez (born 17 January 1992) is a Uruguayan professional footballer who plays as a winger or forward for Uruguayan club Cerro.

Career
In 2014, Foliados signed for Uruguayan second division club Boston River, where he made 19 league appearances and scored 4 goals. On 13 September 2014, he debuted for Boston River in a 2–0 win over Plaza Colonia. On 5 October 2014, Foliados scored his first goal for Boston River in a 1–1 draw with Rocha.

Before the second half of the 2015–16 season, Foliados signed for Honduran team Real España.

Before the 2020 season, Foliados signed for Deportivo Cuenca in Ecuador, where he suffered a skull fracture.

References

External links
 
 

1992 births
Living people
Footballers from Montevideo
Uruguayan footballers
Association football wingers
Association football forwards
Toledo Esporte Clube players
Defensor Sporting players
Boston River players
Sud América players
Real C.D. España players
C.D. Cuenca footballers
Cerro Largo F.C. players
C.A. Cerro players
Campeonato Paranaense players
Uruguayan Primera División players
Uruguayan Segunda División players
Liga Nacional de Fútbol Profesional de Honduras players
Ecuadorian Serie A players
Uruguayan expatriate footballers
Uruguayan expatriate sportspeople in Brazil
Uruguayan expatriate sportspeople in Honduras
Uruguayan expatriate sportspeople in Ecuador
Expatriate footballers in Brazil
Expatriate footballers in Honduras
Expatriate footballers in Ecuador